Remke Scheepstra is a Dutch former cricketer who played as a batter. She appeared for Netherlands in one One Day International, at the 1991 European Women's Cricket Championship against England at Sportpark Koninklijke HFC, Haarlem. Batting at number six, she scored one run.

References

External links
 
 

Living people
Dutch women cricketers
Netherlands women One Day International cricketers
Date of birth missing (living people)
Place of birth missing (living people)
Year of birth missing (living people)